Vehicle registration plates of Georgia may refer to:

Vehicle registration plates of Georgia (country)
Vehicle registration plates of Georgia (U.S. state)